Vinayak Sitaram Sarwate (1884-1972) was a Marathi freedom fighter, political leader, and author from Indore.

He was appointed Sarsanghchalak of RSS in 1940. He clearly stated his align with Congress. He was also the member of Constituent Assembly of India representing the Madhya Bharat state.

He founded with his daughter, Shalini Moghe, "Bal Niketan Sangh", an organization in social service and education.

He was awarded the Padma Bhushan, third highest civilian honour of India by the President of India, in 1966.

References

Marathi people
Recipients of the Padma Bhushan in literature & education
1884 births
1972 deaths
Rajya Sabha members from Madhya Bharat
People from Indore